The McNab Bank Building is a historic building in Eufaula, Alabama, U.S.. It was built in the 1850s for John McNab, a Scottish-born banker. It has been listed on the National Register of Historic Places since June 24, 1971.

References

National Register of Historic Places in Alabama
Commercial buildings completed in 1855
Barbour County, Alabama